Robert Lee Pitman (born 1962) is an American attorney and jurist who serves as a United States district judge of the United States District Court for the Western District of Texas and former United States Attorney for the Western District of Texas. He was previously a United States magistrate judge of the same court.

Early life and education

Pitman was born in Fort Worth, Texas in 1962, the youngest of five children. He received a Bachelor of Science degree from Abilene Christian University, where he was student body president. Pitman then obtained a Juris Doctor from the University of Texas School of Law. After completing law school, Pitman served as a law clerk for Judge David Owen Belew Jr. of the United States District Court for the Northern District of Texas in Fort Worth. Pitman holds a Master of Studies degree in International Human Rights Law from the University of Oxford.

Career

Following his judicial clerkship, Pitman began his career at the international law firm of Fulbright and Jaworski. In 2001, Pitman briefly served as interim United States Attorney for the Western District of Texas. As United States Attorney on September 11, 2001, he formed the first anti-terrorism task force in the district, uniting local, state, and federal law enforcement agencies in their counter-terrorism efforts and in their work to better secure Texas' international border. He was replaced by George W. Bush appointee Johnny Sutton, who asked Pitman to remain in the office as his chief deputy. In October 2003, Pitman was selected to serve as a United States magistrate judge for the United States District Court for the Western District of Texas. As Magistrate Judge, Pitman consistently ranked highest among all local, state, and federal judges in the judicial poll conducted annually by the Austin Bar Association. In 2009, Republican Senators John Cornyn and Kay Bailey Hutchison sent Pitman's name to Democratic President Barack Obama as one of two candidates for United States Attorney for the Western District of Texas. The recommendation of Pitman, who is openly gay, was publicly opposed by a social conservative group in Texas. On June 27, 2011, almost two years after Pitman was recommended for the post, Obama notified members of Congress that he would nominate Pitman to be United States Attorney for the Western District of Texas. He was formally nominated the following day. Citing his credentials and experience, and expressing a desire to fill the position with the most qualified candidate, he was supported by Texas' two United States Senators, both Republicans. With their support, the United States Senate confirmed Pitman to be the chief federal law enforcement officer in the Western District of Texas on September 26, 2011. He took office on October 3, 2011. He left office on December 19, 2014, upon receiving his judicial commission. He is currently an adjunct professor at the University of Texas School of Law.

Federal judicial service 

On June 26, 2014, President Barack Obama nominated Pitman to serve as a United States District Judge of the United States District Court for the Western District of Texas, to the seat vacated by Judge William Royal Furgeson, Jr., who took senior status on November 30, 2008. He received a hearing before the United States Senate Committee on the Judiciary for September 9, 2014. On November 20, 2014, his nomination was reported out of committee by voice vote. On Saturday, December 13, 2014, Senate Majority Leader Harry Reid filed a motion to invoke cloture on the nomination. On December 16, 2014, Reid withdrew his cloture motion on Pitman's nomination, and the Senate proceeded to vote to confirm Pitman in a voice vote. He received his federal judicial commission on December 19, 2014.

On October 6, 2021, Pitman ordered Texas to suspend the Texas Heartbeat Act, a law which banned most abortions, calling it an "offensive deprivation of such an important right." Two days later the U.S. Fifth Circuit Court of Appeals reversed Pitman's suspension order, permitting the law to be enforced again.

On December 1, 2021, Pitman struck down a Texas law which attempted to prevent censorship by social media platforms, in the case, NetChoice, Inc. v. Paxton.

Personal life

Pitman is a sixth-generation Texan and lives in Austin. He is an avid outdoorsman and horseman. Pitman was the first openly gay United States Attorney in Texas. He was one of four openly LGBT U.S. Attorneys, alongside Jenny Durkan of the Western District of Washington, Laura Duffy of the Southern District of California and Anne Tompkins of the Western District of North Carolina. Upon receiving his judicial commission, Pitman became the first openly gay judge to sit on the federal bench within the Fifth Circuit of the federal court system, which covers Texas, Louisiana, and Mississippi.

See also 
 List of LGBT jurists in the United States

References

External links

U.S. Attorney's Office for the Western District of Texas
Biography of the U.S. Attorney 

1962 births
Living people
20th-century American lawyers
21st-century American judges
21st-century American lawyers
Abilene Christian University alumni
Alumni of the University of Oxford
American gay men
Assistant United States Attorneys
Judges of the United States District Court for the Western District of Texas
LGBT appointed officials in the United States
LGBT judges
LGBT lawyers
LGBT people from Texas
People from Fort Worth, Texas
Texas lawyers
United States Attorneys for the Western District of Texas
United States district court judges appointed by Barack Obama
United States magistrate judges
University of Texas School of Law alumni